Doliće may refer to:

 Doliće, Serbia, a village near Sjenica, Serbia
 Doliće, Croatia, a village near Krapina, Croatia